Bayou des Arc is a  river in Arkansas, United States of America.  It is a tributary of the White River, into which it flows near the city of Des Arc in Prairie County, Arkansas.  It rises in northwest White County, Arkansas, near the town of Rose Bud.

References

External links

Rivers of Arkansas
Tributaries of the White River (Arkansas–Missouri)
Bodies of water of Prairie County, Arkansas
Bodies of water of White County, Arkansas